Titanic Quarter in Belfast, Northern Ireland, is a large-scale waterfront regeneration, comprising  historic maritime landmarks, film studios, education facilities, apartments, a riverside entertainment district, and the world's largest Titanic-themed attraction centred on land in Belfast Harbour, known until 1995 as Queen's Island. The  site, previously occupied by part of the Harland and Wolff shipyard, is named after the company's, and the city's, most famous product, RMS Titanic. Titanic Quarter is part of the Dublin-based group, Harcourt Developments, which has held the development rights since 2003.

Completed projects

The largest development is the £97 million Titanic Belfast visitor attraction which holds the record for the island's largest ever single concrete pour (4,300 cubic metres) for its foundations. The building opened on 31 March 2012 and attracted over 800,000 visitors in its first year. The attraction is owned by a charitable foundation. The architects said that "we have created an architectural icon that captures the spirit of the shipyards, ships, water crystals, ice, and the White Star Line's logo. Its architectural form cuts a skyline silhouette that has been inspired by the very ships that were built on this hallowed ground."

In 2005 the Catalyst Inc opened. It is a hi-tech science park affiliated closely with Queen's University Belfast and University of Ulster and Titanic Studios (aka the Paint Hall Studios, a film studio originally created by film producer Jo Gilbert) and used during the production of films including Tom Hanks's City of Ember starring Bill Murray, Your Highness and HBO's television series Game of Thrones.

The new £30 million headquarters of the Public Record Office of Northern Ireland opened at 2 Titanic Boulevard in April 2011. PRONI is the national archive for Northern Ireland and holds records dating from 1219.

In September 2011, the largest education facility in Northern Ireland – Belfast Institute for Further and Higher Education (now Belfast Metropolitan College) relocated to a new £44 million campus in Titanic Quarter.

Belfast Harbour Marina opened in the centre of Titanic Quarter in 2009 as part of the Belfast Tall Ships Festival. Located in the Abercorn Basin, it features 40 berths for leisure craft, it was funded by the Northern Ireland Tourist Board and Belfast Tall Ships 2009 Ltd. It is the forerunner to a future 200 berth marina in the Titanic Quarter.

In November 2010 the first hotel, a Premier Inn  with onsite restaurant, opened in Titanic Quarter. Over 40 new jobs were created.

In September 2017 a second hotel, Titanic Hotel Belfast, opened in the former Harland & Wolff Headquarters and Drawing Offices, billed as the "world's most authentic Titanic hotel".

Belfast Audi, operated by the Agnew Group, opened its new headquarters in November 2010. Located at 80 Sydenham Road, it created 115 new jobs.

The first residential development in Titanic Quarter was completed in December 2010. The Arc comprises apartments and shops, and is located adjacent to Abercorn Basin.

Belfast Porsche, operated by the Agnew Group, opened its new showroom beside Belfast Audi in December 2017. This replaced the existing showroom on Boucher Crescent.

Sport
In September 2014, Northern Irish boxer Carl Frampton won the IBF world super-bantamweight title in a specially constructed outdoor arena in the Titanic Quarter in front of 16,000 fans, Northern Ireland's largest ever boxing crowd.

Transport
The Titanic Quarter is served by Translink Metro Services 94, 600A and 600B bus services, which run from Donegall Square North (Across from City Hall) to Holywood Exchange, Catalyst Inc, and Belfast City Airport, via The SSE Arena, Queens Road, Titanic Belfast and Belfast Harbour Estate East.

The area is also served by NI Railways services to Titanic Quarter (Bridge End) station, which is the first station heading towards Bangor on the Belfast–Bangor line from Lanyon Place.

The G2 service, operated by the Belfast Rapid Transit System (Glider) also terminates at Titanic Quarter.

See also
Belfast Quarters
 

Catalyst Inc

References

External links

Official site of the Titanic Quarter
Official site of the Titanic Belfast visitor attraction
Official site of Harcourt Developments

Buildings and structures under construction in the United Kingdom
Quarters of Belfast
RMS Titanic
Redeveloped ports and waterfronts in the United Kingdom